Gongora aromatica is a species of orchid found in Colombia, Costa Rica, Ecuador, Mexico, Nicaragua, Panama and Peru.

References

External links

aromatica
Orchids of Colombia
Orchids of Costa Rica
Orchids of Ecuador
Orchids of Mexico
Orchids of Nicaragua
Orchids of Panama
Orchids of Peru